The 2022 season was the Indianapolis Colts' 70th in the National Football League (NFL), their 39th in Indianapolis, their sixth under the leadership of general manager Chris Ballard and their fifth and final season under head coach Frank Reich.

In the off-season, the Colts acquired pro-bowler quarterback Matt Ryan in exchange for a 3rd round pick. 

The Colts were the first team since the  1987 Green Bay Packers to start 1-1-1.

After a 3–5–1 start, head coach Reich was fired from the team with former Colts offensive lineman Jeff Saturday being named the interim head coach. Saturday won his first game with the Colts against the Raiders, but did not win any more games, as the team finished the season on a 7–game losing streak.  On December 17, The Colts were defeated by the Minnesota Vikings  in a game that was notable for being the biggest blown lead in NFL history, as the Colts squandered a 33–0 halftime lead to lose 39–36 in overtime. The Colts missed the postseason for the second straight season.

Draft

Draft trades

Staff

Final roster

Preseason
The Colts' preseason opponents and schedule were announced in the spring.

Regular season

Schedule

Note: Intra-division opponents are in bold text.

Game summaries

Week 1: at Houston Texans

This was the Colts first tie game since the 1982 season when they were based in Baltimore.
Because the Browns won their season opener for the first time since 2004, coupled with this game, the Colts now hold the NFL's longest active season opener winless streak, not having won a season opener since 2013.

Week 2: at Jacksonville Jaguars

The Colts failed to capitalize on offense, and were shutout for the first time since week 13 of the 2018 season, which was also against the Jaguars. This was also their eighth consecutive loss in Jacksonville.

Week 3: vs. Kansas City Chiefs

Week 4: vs. Tennessee Titans

Week 5: at Denver Broncos

Week 6: vs. Jacksonville Jaguars

Week 7: at Tennessee Titans

Week 8: vs. Washington Commanders

Week 9: at New England Patriots

Week 10: at Las Vegas Raiders

Week 11: vs. Philadelphia Eagles

Week 12: vs. Pittsburgh Steelers

Week 13: at Dallas Cowboys

Week 15: at Minnesota Vikings

Week 16: vs. Los Angeles Chargers

Week 17: at New York Giants

Week 18: vs. Houston Texans

Standings

Division

Conference

References

External links
 

Indianapolis
Indianapolis Colts seasons
Indianapolis Colts